Khuwaylid ibn Asad was a member of the Arab Banu Quraysh tribe and is recognized for being the father of Khadijah bint Khuwaylid, the wife of the Islamic prophet Muhammad.

Family
He was the son of Asad ibn Abd-Al-Uzza ibn Qusai ibn Kilab and a cousin of Abdul-Muttalib as his grandfather (Abd-al-Uzza ibn Qusai) and Abdul-Muttalib's grandfather ('Abd Manaf ibn Qusai) were brothers. Khuwaylid married Fatima bint Za'idah, who was a member of the Amir ibn Luayy clan of the Quraysh and a third cousin of Muhammad's mother, Aminah bint Wahb. Some of their children would become prominent people in early Islamic history  e.g.:
Awwam ibn Khuwaylid
Halah bint Khuwailid
Khadijah bint Khuwaylid
Hizam ibn Khuwaylid

From another marriage he had a son Nawfal ibn Khuwaylid.

Business
He was a rich merchant, a successful businessman whose vast wealth and business talents were inherited by Khadijah. She succeeded him in managing with the family's wealth.

Death
He died in 600 CE during the Ḥarb al-fijār ('sacrilegious war') before the battle of Fijar.

References

530 births
588 deaths
6th-century Arabs
Year of birth unknown
Khadija bint Khuwaylid
Banu Asad (Quraysh)